Mihira is an ancient Indian word meaning "Sun". It may refer to:

 Mithra, the Indo-Iranian sun god
 Varahamihira, ancient Indian astronomer
 Mihirakula, a Huna king
 Mihira Bhoja, a 9th-century ruler of the Pratihara dynasty